Events from the year 1827 in Sweden

Incumbents
 Monarch – Charles XIV John

Events

 Royal Institute of Technology is founded.
 Sophie Daguin appointed ballet mistress at the Royal Swedish Ballet.
 9 June - Norra begravningsplatsen is inaugurated. 
 Creation of the Norrlands nation.
 Foundation of Sällskapet för uppmuntran av öm och sedlig modersvård.

Births
 31 May - Zelma Hedin, stage actress (died 1874) 
 1 May – Agnes Börjesson, painter  (died 1900) 
 22 August - Emil von Qvanten, poet, librarian, publisher and politician   (died 1903) 
 8 September - Hilda Elfving, educator  (died 1906)
 Emma Schenson, photographer  (died 1913)

Deaths

 Carl Adolph Grevesmühl, businessperson   (born 1744)

References

 
Years of the 19th century in Sweden